This is a list of schools in Cheshire West and Chester, a unitary authority in Cheshire, England.

State-funded schools

Primary schools

The Acorns Primary and Nursery School, Ellesmere Port
Acresfield Academy, Upton-by-Chester
Alvanley and Manley Village School, Alvanley
Antrobus St Mark's CE Primary School, Antrobus
The Arches Community Primary School, Blacon
Aston by Sutton Primary School Aston-by-Sutton
Barnton Community Nursery and Primary School, Barnton
Barrow CE Primary School, Barrow
Belgrave Primary School, Westminster Park
Bishop Wilson CE Primary School, Burton
Boughton Heath Academy, Great Boughton
Brookside Primary School, Great Sutton
Byley Primary School and Nursery, Byley
Cambridge Road Community Primary and Nursery School, Ellesmere Port
Capenhurst CE Primary School, Capenhurst
Charles Darwin Community Primary School, Northwich
Cherry Grove Primary School, Chester
Chester Blue Coat CE Primary School, Chester
Childer Thornton Primary School, Childer Thornton
Christleton Primary School, Christleton
Clutton CE Primary School, Clutton
Comberbach Nursery and Primary School, Comberbach
Crowton Christ Church CE Primary School, Crowton
Cuddington Primary School, Cuddington
Darnhall Primary School, Darnhall
Davenham CE Primary School, Davenham
Dee Point Primary School, Blacon
Delamere CE Primary Academy, Kelsall
Dodleston CE Primary School, Dodleston
Duddon St Peter's CE Primary School, Duddon
Eaton Primary School, Eaton
Eccleston CE Primary School, Eccleston
Ellesmere Port Christ Church CE Primary School, Ellesmere Port
Elton Primary School, Elton
Farndon Primary School, Farndon
Frodsham CE Primary School, Frodsham
Frodsham Manor House Primary School, Frodsham
Frodsham Primary Academy, Frodsham
Grange Community Nursery and Primary School, Winsford
Great Budworth CE Primary School, Great Budworth
The Grosvenor Park CE Academy, Chester
Guilden Sutton CE Primary School, Guilden Sutton
Hartford Manor Primary School & Nursery, Hartford
Hartford Primary School, Hartford
Helsby Hillside Primary School, Helsby
Highfield Community Primary School, Blacon
Hoole CE Primary School, Hoole
Horn's Mill Primary School, Helsby
Huntington Community Primary School, Huntington
Huxley CE Primary School, Huxley
JH Godwin Primary School, Blacon
Kelsall Primary and Nursery School, Kelsall
Kingsley Community Primary School and Nursery, Kingsley
Kingsley St John's CE Primary School, Kingsley
Kingsmead Primary School, Kingsmead
Lache Primary School, Lache
Leftwich Community Primary School, Leftwich
Little Leigh Primary School, Little Leigh
Little Sutton CE Primary School, Little Sutton
Lostock Gralam CE Primary School, Lostock Gralam
Lower Peover CE Primary School, Lower Peover
Malpas Alport Endowed Primary School, Malpas
Meadow Community Primary School, Great Sutton
Mickle Trafford Village School, Mickle Trafford
Mill View Primary School, Upton-by-Chester
Moulton School, Moulton
Neston Primary School, Little Neston
Newton Primary School, Newton
Norley CE Primary School, Norley
The Oak View Academy, Over
The Oaks Community Primary School, Ellesmere Port
Oldfield Primary School, Vicars Cross
Our Lady Star of the Sea RC Primary School, Ellesmere Port
Over Hall Community School, Winsford
Over St John's CE Primary School, Winsford
Overleigh St Mary's CE Primary School, Handbridge
Parkgate Primary School, Parkgate
Parklands Community Primary School, Little Sutton
Rivacre Valley Primary School, Overpool
Rossmore School, Little Sutton
Rudheath Primary Academy and Nursery, Rudheath
Saighton CE Primary School & Pre-School, Saighton
St Bede's RC Primary School, Weaverham
St Bernard's RC Primary School, Ellesmere Port
St Chad's CE Primary and Nursery School, Winsford
St Clare's RC Primary School, Lache
St Joseph's RC Primary School, Winsford
St Luke's RC Primary School, Frodsham
St Martin's Academy, Chester
St Mary of the Angels RC Primary School, Little Sutton
St Oswald's CE Primary School, Mollington
St Saviour's RC Primary and Nursery School, Great Sutton
St Theresa's RC Primary School, Blacon
St Werburgh's and St Columba's RC Primary School, Hoole
St Wilfrid's RC Primary School, Hartford
St Winefride's RC Primary School, Little Neston
Sandiway Primary School, Sandiway
Saughall All Saints CE Primary School, Saughall
Shocklach Oviatt CE Primary School, Shocklach
Sutton Green Primary School, Little Sutton
Tarporley CE Primary School, Tarporley
Tarvin Primary School, Tarvin
Tattenhall Park Primary School, Tattenhall
Thomas Wedge Church of England Primary School
Tilston Parochial CE Primary School, Tilston
Tushingham-with-Grindley CE Primary School, Tushingham
Upton Heath CE Primary School, Upton-by-Chester
Upton Westlea Primary School, Upton-by-Chester
Utkinton St Paul's CE Primary School, Utkinton
Victoria Road Primary School, Northwich
Waverton Community Primary School, Waverton
Weaverham Forest Primary School, Weaverham
Weaverham Primary Academy, Weaverham
Westminster Community Primary School, Ellesmere Port
Wharton CE Primary School, Wharton
Whitby Heath Primary School, Ellesmere Port
Whitegate CE Primary School, Whitegate
Whitley Village School, Lower Whitley
Willaston CE Primary School, Willaston
William Stockton Community Primary School, Ellesmere Port
Willow Wood Community Nursery & Primary School, Wharton
Wimboldsley Community Primary School, Wimboldsley
Wincham Community Primary School, Wincham
Winnington Park Community Primary and Nursery School, Winnington
Winsford High Street Community Primary School, Winsford
Witton Church Walk CE Primary School, Northwich
Wolverham Primary and Nursery School, Ellesmere Port
Woodfall Primary School, Little Neston
Woodlands Primary School, Ellesmere Port

Secondary schools

Bishop Heber High School, Malpas
Bishops' Blue Coat Church of England High School, Great Boughton
Blacon High School, Blacon
Chester Catholic High School, Chester
Chester International School, Chester
Christleton High School, Christleton
The County High School, Leftwich
Ellesmere Port Catholic High School, Ellesmere Port
Ellesmere Port Church of England College, Ellesmere Port
Hartford High School, Hartford
Helsby High School, Helsby
Neston High School, Neston
Queen's Park High School, Handbridge
Rudheath Senior Academy, Rudheath
St Nicholas Catholic High School, Hartford
Tarporley High School, Tarporley
Upton-by-Chester High School, Upton-by-Chester
Weaverham High School, Weaverham
The Whitby High School, Ellesmere Port
The Winsford Academy, Winsford

Special and alternative schools

Ancora House School, Chester
Archers Brook SEMH Residential School, Great Sutton
The Bridge Short Stay School, Ellesmere Port
Cloughwood Academy, Hartford
Dee Banks School, Chester
Dorin Park School, Upton-by-Chester
Greenbank School, Hartford
Hebden Green Community School, Winsford
Hinderton School, Ellesmere Port
Oaklands School, Winsford
Rosebank School, Barnton
The Russett School, Weaverham

Further education
Mid Cheshire College, now merged into Warrington and Vale Royal College
Sir John Deane's College
Cheshire College – South & West

Independent schools

Primary and preparatory schools
The Firs School, Chester

Senior and all-through schools
Abbey Gate College, Saighton
Cransley School, Great Budworth
The Grange School, Hartford
The Hammond, Chester
The King's School, Chester
OneSchool Global UK, Hartford
The Queen's School, Chester

Special and alternative schools
Abbey School for Exceptional Children, Chester
iMap Centre, Barrow
Jefferson House, Darnhall
Maple Grove School, Chester

 
Cheshire West and Chester